Baltabay is a small town in Almaty Region of south-eastern Kazakhstan. Baltabay is located along the A351 highway, to the west of Akshiy. A small lake is located to the north-west of the town. To the east of the town are industrial buildings.

External links
Tageo.com

Populated places in Almaty Region